Daniel Rupf (born 21 March 1986) is a German footballer who played as a central midfielder for VfB Auerbach.

Career

Rupf began his career with Erzgebirge Aue, and made his 2. Bundesliga debut for the club in September 2006, as a substitute for Kevin Hampf in a 1–1 draw with Wacker Burghausen. He made four more appearances for Aue, leaving in August 2008, shortly after the club had been relegated to the 3. Liga. He spent the 2008–09 season with FC Sachsen Leipzig, of the Regionalliga Nord, but they were relegated too, so Rupf signed for VFC Plauen of the same division. In July 2014, Rupf signed for Carl Zeiss Jena.

References

External links

Daniel Rupf at Fupa

1986 births
Living people
German footballers
FC Erzgebirge Aue players
FC Sachsen Leipzig players
FC Carl Zeiss Jena players
2. Bundesliga players
Regionalliga players
Association football midfielders
FSV Budissa Bautzen players
People from Stollberg
Footballers from Saxony